The Roman Catholic Diocese of Shangqiu /Guide/ Kweíteh is a suffragan Latin diocese in the Ecclesiastical province of Kaifeng in eastern China, yet depends on the missionary Roman Congregation for the Evangelization of Peoples.

Its cathedral episcopal see is Cathedral of the Sacred Heart of Jesus (South Church),  located in the city of Shangqiu 商丘 (formerly Guide/ Kweíteh), in Henan province.

No statistics available. It is vacant, without apostolic administrator, since 2009.

History 
 Established June 19, 1928 as Apostolic Prefecture of Guide 歸德/ de Kweiteh (Latin), on territory split off from the then Apostolic Vicariate of Kaifengfu 開封府 (now its Metropolitan)
 Promoted on May 18, 1937 as Apostolic Vicariate of Guide 歸德
 Promoted on April 11, 1946 as Diocese of Shangqiu/Guide 歸德 / Cœiteven(sis) (Latin)

Episcopal ordinaries
(all Roman rite, so far members of a missionary Latin Congregation)

Apostolic Prefect of Guide/ Kweíteh 歸德 
 father Francisco Javier Ochoa Ullate, Order of Saint Augustine (O.A.R.) (born Spain) (8 January 1929 – 18 May 1937 see below)

Apostolic Vicar of Guide/ Kweíteh 歸德 
 Francisco Javier Ochoa Ullate, O.A.R. (see above 18 May 1937 – 11 April 1946 see below), Titular Bishop of Chusira (1937.05.18 – 1946.04.11)

Suffragan Bishops of Shangqiu/Guide 
 Francisco Javier Ochoa Ullate, O.A.R. (see above 11 April 1946 – retired 11 December 1947), emeritate as Titular Bishop of Remesiana (1947.12.11 – death 1976.09.06)
 Arturo Quintanilla Manzanares, O.A.R. (born Spain) (10 November 1949 – death 21 November 1970)
 Nicholas Shi Jing-xian, O.S.A. (first China-born incumbent) (1991 - uncanonical since 1999 - death 2001)
 vacancy.

See also 

 List of Catholic dioceses in China

Sources and external links 
 GCatholic.org - data for all sections
 Catholic Hierarchy

Roman Catholic dioceses in China
Religious organizations established in 1928
Roman Catholic dioceses and prelatures established in the 20th century